Mesorhizobium qingshengii is a bacterium from the genus Mesorhizobium which was isolated from root nodules of Astragalus sinicus in the southeast of China.

References

External links
Type strain of Mesorhizobium qingshengii at BacDive -  the Bacterial Diversity Metadatabase

Phyllobacteriaceae
Bacteria described in 2013